The Western Design is the term commonly used for an English expedition against the Spanish West Indies during the 1654 to 1660 Anglo-Spanish War. 

Part of an ambitious plan by Oliver Cromwell to end Spanish dominance in the Americas, the force was short of supplies and many of the men poorly trained. Leadership was split between Robert Venables, commander of land forces, and Admiral William Penn; the relationship between the two quickly broke down, and they regarded each other with distrust and suspicion. The attack on Hispaniola was a failure but the English then subsequently took Jamaica and claimed it for the English crown.

Background
The purpose of the expedition was to attack the Spanish West Indies and secure a permanent base in the Caribbean, allowing English ships to threaten trade routes between Spanish America and mainland Europe. The idea originated in the Providence Island Company, a Puritan colony established off the coast of Nicaragua in 1630 and abandoned in 1641. First discussed by the Council of State in June 1654, the plan or "Design" was based on advice from Thomas Gage, a former missionary regarded as an expert on the region. He claimed the Spanish colonies of Hispaniola and Cuba were weakly defended and could easily be seized by a determined force, advice which proved incorrect.

Dismissed as unfeasible and too expensive by military commanders including John Lambert, the project was largely driven by Oliver Cromwell who had been involved in the Providence colony. In negotiations that ended the 1652 to 1654 First Anglo-Dutch War, he suggested a union between the Protestant Dutch Republic and Commonwealth of England. Combining the two most powerful European navies would allow them to control trade and dictate terms to the Catholic monarchies of France and Spain; the Western Design would start this process by ousting Spain from the Americas. Although the Dutch declined the offer of union, Cromwell proceeded with the plan, in part because continuous victories over the last decade convinced him "Providence" was on his side. This belief meant its subsequent failure strongly affected him and many others.        

A committee under Cromwell's brother-in-law General John Disbrowe supervised logistics; with the end of the Dutch war, the New Model Army was being reduced and the expedition provided an opportunity to employ surplus troops. However, relatively few were willing to serve in an area notorious for sickness and disease; of the 2,500 troops who sailed from England, fewer than half were experienced, the rest untrained recruits. They were led by Robert Venables, a veteran of the Wars of the Three Kingdoms recently returned from four years of often brutal campaigning in Ireland; although well regarded by Cromwell, his complaints about the poor condition of these troops were ignored.

Venables shared command with Admiral William Penn, who had a fleet of eighteen warships and twenty transport vessels; he too was an experienced and competent officer, but joint command resulted in friction and mutual hostility between the two men. They were accompanied by Daniel Searle, the Governor of Barbados, and two civilian commissioners, Edward Winslow, former Governor of Plymouth Colony, and Gregory Butler, who were to supervise colonisation of the captured lands.

Expedition

The fleet left Portsmouth at the end of December 1654 and arrived in Barbados a month later. Between three and four thousand additional troops were raised from volunteers among the indentured servants and freemen in the colonies of Barbados, Montserrat, Nevis and St Kitts to make the numbers of the five original regiments up to 1,000 men each and to form a sixth regiment. The troop numbers looked impressive, but they were untrained and badly disciplined. Furthermore, supplies were running low and the joint commanders Penn and Venables were arguing with one another. Morale among the soldiers sank lower still when the civilian commissioners stipulated that they were not to plunder the Spanish colonies they were about to attack but rather to preserve them intact for subsequent English colonisation.

An attack on the main target of Hispaniola, the island which now holds Haiti and the Dominican Republic, was repulsed in April 1655, the English suffering heavy losses from disease. In May, they captured the weakly-defended island of Jamaica, but overall the expedition failed to achieve its goals.

Aftermath
Venables and Penn hurried back to England on separate ships hoping to blame the other for the lack of success; they were charged with desertion and dismissed from the military. Although Penn returned to the navy after The Restoration in 1660, this ended Venables' career. 

For England, Jamaica was to be the 'dagger pointed at the heart of the Spanish Empire,' although in fact it was a possession of little economic value then. Despite several attempts by the Spanish to recapture Jamaica, they formally ceded the island in 1670 and it remained in British hands for over 300 years until it received independence in 1962.

References

Sources
 
 
 
 
 
 

17th-century military history of the Kingdom of England
Anglo-Spanish War (1654–1660)
North America in the English Civil War